Nicole F. Bell (born 1975) is an Australian physicist who is a professor at the University of Melbourne. She is Vice President of the Australian Institute of Physics. She was awarded the 2020 Australian Academy of Science Nancy Millis Medal for her work on dark matter and particle theory.

Early life and education 
Bell is from Australia. She earned her doctorate at the University of Melbourne. Her research considered neutrino oscillations in the early universe. After earning her doctorate, Bell moved to the United States and joined the Fermilab Center for Particle Astrophysics as a research fellow. Early in her career she gave a talk at the John Templeton Foundation Young Researchers Competition, presenting her work on cosmology to John Archibald Wheeler, Freeman Dyson and Lisa Randall. She explained that the high density of matter in the early universe caused neutrinos to collide with other particles, causing them to decohere. This can cause the inhibition of neutrino oscillations. After three years at Fermilab, Bell was awarded a Sherman Fairchild Prize Fellowship at the California Institute of Technology.

Research and career 
Bell returned to the University of Melbourne in 2007. In 2011, she was made a Chief Investigator of the Australian Research Council Centre of Excellence for Particle Physics at the Terascale, and in 2020, the Theory Program leader of the Centre of Excellence for Dark Matter Particle Physics.

Bell is a theoretical astroparticle physicist who works on dark matter, neutrino physics, and other topics in particle and astroparticle theory In particular, Bell has explored the relationship between dark matter and matter-antimatter asymmetries. She used cosmology to better understand the properties of neutrinos, and looked to explain whether dark matter can be used to understand galactic gamma rays. In 2021 Bell was elected Vice President of the Australian Institute of Physics.

Awards and honours 
 2001 Bragg Gold Medal in Physics
 2012 Australian Research Council Future Fellowship
 2016 Elected Fellow of the American Physical Society
 2020 Elected Fellow of the Australian Institute of Physics
 2020 Australian Academy of Science Nancy Millis Medal

Selected publications

Personal life 
Bell has three children.

References 

Living people
1975 births
University of Melbourne alumni
Academic staff of the University of Melbourne
Australian women physicists
20th-century Australian physicists
21st-century Australian physicists
Fellows of the American Physical Society